Grigorovo is a rural locality (a village) in Slednevskoye Rural Settlement, Alexandrovsky District, Vladimir Oblast, Russia. The population was 3 as of 2010.

Geography 
The village is located on the Seraya River, 18 km north-east from Slednevo, 10 km north-east from Alexandrov.

References 

Rural localities in Alexandrovsky District, Vladimir Oblast